Titaea is a genus of moths in the family Saturniidae first described by Jacob Hübner in 1823.

Species
 Titaea lemoulti (Schaus, 1905)
 Titaea orsinome Hübner, 1823
 Titaea raveni Johnson & Michener, 1948
 Titaea tamerlan (Maassen, 1869)
 Titaea timur (Fassl, 1915)

References

Arsenurinae